Frolovsky is a rural locality (a settlement) in Karachevsky District, Bryansk Oblast, Russia. The population was 1 as of 2013. There is 1 street.

Geography 
Frolovsky is located 38 km west of Karachev (the district's administrative centre) by road. Nikultsevy dvory is the nearest rural locality.

References 

Rural localities in Karachevsky District